The 2008–09 Azerbaijan Premier League is the 17th season of Azerbaijan Premier League, the Azerbaijani professional league for association football clubs, since its establishment in 1992. Inter Baku were the defending champions, having won the previous season.

Teams
FK Gänclärbirliyi Sumqayit and ABN Bärdä were relegated after finishing the previous season in 13th and 14th place, respectively. They were replaced by the champions of the two groups in the Azerbaijan First Division, Bakılı Baku and MOIK Baku.

On 8 July 2008, FK Masallı withdrew their participation from the league, citing competitional and financial problems as reasons. Although it was unclear as of 21 July if the Azerbaijan Football Federation would be naming a substitute or if the championship would start with just 13 teams, shortly thereafter AFFA named FK NBC Salyan to replace Masallı in top league.

On 31 October 2008, FK NBC Salyan changed their name to FK Mughan.

Stadia and locations

1Karabakh played their home matches at Surakhani Stadium in Baku before moving to their current stadium on 3 May 2009.

Personnel

Managerial changes

League table

Results

Season statistics

Top scorers

Hat-tricks

 4 Player scored 4 goals

Scoring
 First goal of the season: Kanan Karimov for Gabala against NBC Salyan (9 August 2008) 
 Fastest goal of the season: 1st minute, 
Angel Gutierrez for Standard Baku against Gabala (25 October 2008)
Farzad Hatami for Gabala against Karvan (22 March 2009)
 Largest winning margin: 7 goals
Bakılı Baku 0–7 Baku (28 September 2008) 
Baku 7–0 Turan Tovuz (22 November 2008) 
 Highest scoring game: 7 goals
Bakılı Baku 0–7 Baku (28 September 2008)
Baku 7–0 Turan Tovuz (22 November 2008)
MOIK Baku 1–6 Olimpik Baku (11 May 2009) 
 Most goals scored in a match by a single team: 7 goals
Bakılı Baku 0–7 Baku (28 September 2008)
Baku 7–0 Turan Tovuz (22 November 2008)
 Most goals scored in a match by a losing team: 2 goals
Bakılı Baku 3–2 NBC Salyan (9 November 2008) 
Khazar Lankaran 2–4 Inter Baku (9 November 2008) 
Karabakh 3–2 Karvan (29 November 2008) 
MOIK Baku 2–4 Simurq (1 March 2009) 
Karabakh 4–2 Turan Tovuz (5 April 2009)

Clean sheets
 Most clean sheets: 19
Baku
 Fewest clean sheets: 1
Bakılı Baku
MOIK Baku

References

Azerbaijan Premier League seasons
Azer
1